Stoyanovo may refer to the following places in Bulgaria:

 Stoyanovo, Kardzhali Province
 Stoyanovo, Montana Province